Andrés Roberto Calonge (born 2 April 1945) is an Argentine sprinter. He competed in the 100 metres at the 1968 Summer Olympics and the 1972 Summer Olympics.

References

1945 births
Living people
Athletes (track and field) at the 1968 Summer Olympics
Athletes (track and field) at the 1972 Summer Olympics
Argentine male sprinters
Olympic athletes of Argentina
Athletes (track and field) at the 1967 Pan American Games
Athletes (track and field) at the 1971 Pan American Games
Pan American Games competitors for Argentina
Place of birth missing (living people)
20th-century Argentine people